Zhang Shuofu (born August 1965) is a Chinese politician, and the current Communist Party Secretary of Guangzhou. A Hunan native with a background in waterworks, Zhang's political career seemingly took off in 2015, being assigned a succession of prominent roles around the country.

Biography
Zhang was born in Wangcheng County, Hunan. He joined the Communist Party of China in August 1984. He graduated from the Wuhan College of Hydraulic Engineering (now part of Wuhan University) with a bachelor's, then master's degree. He later obtained a doctorate degree at Hunan University in environmental science engineering. 

Zhang spent most of his career in the hydroelectric industry, going through a series of engineering and administrative jobs. In June 1995 he took up a job in flood prevention in his home province. In April 1997 he was assigned to work in the provincial department of water works. In April 2000 he was promoted to deputy director. In March 2003, he took on his first full-time political job as deputy party chief of Yiyang. In December 2006, he became provincial director of water works. In March 2008 he became Mayor of Loudi. In June 2011, he became party chief of Yongzhou. In January 2013, he became Vice Governor of Hunan.

Beginning in 2015, Zhang's career saw significant growth. In April 2015, he was named a member of the provincial party standing committee of Yunnan province and head of the provincial discipline inspection commission, taking on his first post outside of his home province. In January 2017 he took over from Li Shulei as head of the discipline inspection commission of Beijing. On July 20, 2018, he was named party chief Guangzhou.

References

1965 births
Alternate members of the 19th Central Committee of the Chinese Communist Party
Politicians from Changsha
Living people
Engineers from Hunan
Chinese Communist Party politicians from Hunan
People's Republic of China politicians from Hunan